The former Berlin High School building is located in Berlin, Wisconsin.

History
The school opened in 1918 with a ceremony that included remarks by Governor Emanuel L. Philipp and Mayor C. W. Hitchcock. It served as a high school until 1996, at which time the new Berlin High School was opened.

The building served as a middle school for a time and has since been converted into apartments. It was added to the National Register of Historic Places in 2016.

References

School buildings on the National Register of Historic Places in Wisconsin
Residential buildings on the National Register of Historic Places in Wisconsin
National Register of Historic Places in Green Lake County, Wisconsin
Public high schools in Wisconsin
Public middle schools in Wisconsin
Schools in Green Lake County, Wisconsin
Defunct schools in Wisconsin
Collegiate Gothic architecture in the United States
Gothic Revival architecture in Wisconsin
Tudor Revival architecture in Wisconsin
Brick buildings and structures
Limestone buildings in the United States
School buildings completed in 1918
1918 establishments in Wisconsin